Robyn McGlohn is the current morning/noon news anchor for WSOC-TV Eyewitness News Daybreak and WAXN-TV Eyewitness News This Morning in Charlotte, North Carolina.

Early life
Robyn McGlohn grew up in Birmingham, Alabama. She attended Hoover High School and graduated from The University of Alabama, where she studied broadcast journalism and earned degrees in telecommunication & film and political science.

Career

Early television career
While in school at the Uviversity of Alabama, McGlohn interned for WDSI-TV FOX CH.61 in Chattanooga, Tenn. and ABC CH.33/40 in Birmingham.

She then accepted a job as a reporter for WVUA in Tuscaloosa in 2004, and eventually moved to weekend anchor/producer before leaving the station in August 2005.

WAFF-TV, Huntsville, Alabama (2005-2010)
In October 2005, McGlohn moved to Huntsville, Alabama to work at NBC affiliate WAFF-TV as a morning reporter. She quickly established herself as an investigative reporter, winning multiple awards for her journalism.

In 2007, she won three Alabama AP Broadcasters Association Awards for Best Spot News Story, "HPD Officer Shot", and Best Investigative Report, "Predator at Preschool". This story ultimately changed the way background checks are done on daycare employees. Her third award was for Best Reporter, for her stories "HPD Officer Shot, DayCare Sex Offender, and Brewery Fire".

In 2008, McGlohn was promoted to the Weekday Morning Anchor/Reporter position and co-anchored the 5am-7am newscasts with Lee Marshall and Meteorologist Jeff Castle. This team proved very successful and quickly progressed to be the No.1 morning news team in the Huntsville market. In April 2009, McGlohn received the Alabama Broadcast Association Best In Broadcast Award (ABBY) for Best News Anchor of 2008.

References

Living people
University of Alabama alumni
American television reporters and correspondents
Television anchors from Birmingham, Alabama
Journalists from Alabama
Year of birth missing (living people)